The Violin Sonata in E-flat major, Op. 18 was written by Richard Strauss between 1887 and 1888. Although not considered a milestone in violin literature, it is frequently performed and recorded. It is noted for its lyrical beauty and its technical demands made on both violinist and pianist.

History
Following the completion of his Cello Sonata and Piano Sonata, Strauss began working on his Violin Sonata in 1887, and finished it in 1888. It was during this time that Strauss fell in love with Pauline de Ahna, the soprano whom he would later wed, and his amorous feelings can be heard throughout the piece.

Structure
Like all of his chamber music, Strauss' sonata follows standard classical form, though it is considered the last of his works to do so. The piece is in three movements, and takes approximately thirty minutes to perform:

Allegro, ma non troppo
Improvisation: Andante cantabile
Finale: Andante - Allegro

The first movement opens with a brief piano solo, followed by lyrical violin interludes, through which the thematic material is presented.
This movement follows typical sonata-allegro form, and although it begins in a melancholy tone, the movement ends jubilantly.

The second movement is unique in that it is an Improvisation; that is, the tranquil violin passages give the impression of improvisational material. This movement maintains a beautiful singing tone throughout, and ends meditatively. It is in ternary form.

The third and final movement begins with a slow, methodical piano introduction which then leads into an exuberant Allegro. After a rush of virtuosic passages from both performers, the sonata comes to an explosive end.

Notable recordings

The earliest recording of the sonata was by Jascha Heifetz with pianist Arpad Sandor for RCA in 1934 (he went on to record it two other times, in 1954 and 1972 in his "final recital" with pianist Brooks Smith).

 Jascha Heifetz and Brooks Smith, released by RCA Victor.
 Ginette Neveu and Gustav Beck, released by EMI Records.
 Gidon Kremer and Oleg Maisenberg, released by Deutsche Grammophon.
 Anne Akiko Meyers and Rohan de Silva, released by RCA.
 Sarah Chang and Wolfgang Sawallisch, released by EMI Records.
 Vadim Repin and Nikolai Lugansky, released by Erato Records.
 Kyung-Wha Chung and Krystian Zimerman, released by Deutsche Grammophon.
 Itzhak Perlman and Emanuel Ax, released by Deutsché Grammophon.

See also
List of compositions by Richard Strauss

References

External links

Performance of Violin Sonata by Korbinian Altenberger (violin) and Hsin-Bei Lee (piano), from the Isabella Stewart Gardner Museum in MP3 format

Chamber music by Richard Strauss
Strauss
1888 compositions
Compositions in E-flat major